NSDS may stand for:

North Sydney Demonstration School
National Skills Development Strategy
Naval Service Diving Section